Sir Gordon Wesley Jewkes  (born 18 November 1931) is a British retired colonial administrator and diplomat. He was Governor of the Falkland Islands and High Commissioner for the British Antarctic Territory from 1985 to 1988.

References 

1931 births
Living people
Governors of the Falkland Islands
Commissioners of the British Antarctic Territory
Knights Commander of the Order of St Michael and St George
Place of birth missing (living people)